Psaltoda adonis, commonly known as the forest demon, is a species of cicada native to Queensland in eastern Australia. It was described by Howard Ashton in 1914.

References

Hemiptera of Australia
Insects described in 1914
Psaltodini